Theatre Passe Muraille is a theatre company in Toronto, Ontario, Canada. The following is a chronological list of the productions that have been staged since its inception.

1969
Futz by Rochelle Owens

1970-1972[?]
Bethune! by collective creation & Peter Boretski
The Black Queen Is Going to Eat You All Up by collective creation & Jim Gerrard
Buffalo Jump by Carol Bolt
Canadian Heroes Series #1 by collective creation and John Boyle

1971
Doukhobors by Paul Thompson

1972
The Farm Show by Paul Thompson

1973
1837: The Farmer's Revolt by Paul Thompson and Rick Salutin

1975
I Love You, Baby Blue by Paul Thompson

1976
The Blues by Hrant Alianak

1977
18 Wheels by John MacLachlan Gray
I Love You, Baby Blue 2 directed by Hrant Aliank}} co-writer collective

1979
Maggie and Pierre by Linda Griffiths

1980
The Crackwalker by Judith Thompson

1983
O.D. on Paradise by Linda Griffiths

1986
Jessica by Linda Griffiths

1989
Fire by Paul Ledoux and David Young

1990
Rigoletto by Michael Hollingsworth, Don Horsburg and Deanne Taylor

1991
Lilies by Michel Marc Bouchard
The Stone Angel by Margaret Laurence, adapted by James W. Nichol

1994
The Last Supper

1996
Still the Night by Theresa Tova

1997
Possible Worlds by John Mighton

1998
The Drawer Boy by Michael Healey
Aurash by Soheil Parsa and Brian Quirt

2008
Hardsell
Smokescreen & Born Ready
Last Days of Graceland

See also
Canadian Stage production history (1987), Toronto
Soulpepper Theatre Company production history (1998), Toronto

References

Canadian theatre company production histories
Theatre companies in Toronto
Theatre in Toronto